The Three Eyes National Park is a 50-yard open-air limestone cave located in the Mirador del Este park, in the Santo Domingo Este municipality of the Dominican Republic. A series of three lakes, or ojos, the site is currently one of the most visited tourist attractions in the country.

History
The site was created centuries ago as a result of tectonic fractures when caves collapsed, forming a bowl-shaped depression which subsequently filled with water. Initially, the cave was used by the indigenous Taíno Indians for religious rituals and fertility rites. The Taíno were the first inhabitants of the Hispaniola island. The three lakes are called "Lago de Azufre" (discovered in 1916), "La Nevera" and "El Lago de las Damas". Some of the lakes also have openings on the outside. A staircase cut into the rock gives access to the first cave. A boat pulls visitors across the second lake to give access to a fourth lake called "Los Zaramagullones," not considered one of the three "eyes" or main lakes since it has an opening to the outside.

Description

The caves are fed by water from an underground river and surrounded by stalactites and stalagmites. The composition of the water varies. Early explorers thought that the first pond was made up of sulphurous water because of its blue hue. However, after testing it was discovered that Lago Azufre is actually composed of calcium minerals.

The fourth and deepest lagoon is freshwater. It was stocked with fish back in the 1940s.

The temperature of the lagoons varies between 20 °C to 29 °C, depending on the site, and their various depths give rise to different colored reflections, blue, green, and sometimes yellow. The depth of the shallowest lagoon, Lago de las Damas, is 8 feet. The deepest, Los Zaramagullones, is 25 feet.

The fauna is also very varied and includes fish, bats and turtles. Surrounding vegetation is lush and abundant.

To visit all four lagoons one needs to be able to climb stairs. All told there are 346 steps connecting the four.

The lagoon furthest away, Lago Los Zaramagullones, can only be accessed by a small ferry raft pulled via rope across Lago La Nevera. Getting there is free, but you will have to pay a small fee (about $2 US) to get out. Los Zaramagullones is arguably the most tranquil and beautiful of the four lagoons. Many production companies have filmed footage here for there movies including: Tarzan, Combat Shock, Jurassic Park III, Oro y Polvo, to mention only a few.

The caves are open from 9 am to 5 pm, and are illuminated at night by many colored lights.

See also
 Santo Domingo Este
 Cenote

References

External links
Los Tres Ojos travel guide

Caves of the Dominican Republic
Indigenous topics of the Caribbean
Geography of Santo Domingo Province
Tourist attractions in Santo Domingo Province
Caves of the Caribbean